Eleanor Daniels (28 December 1886 – 18 March 1994) was a Welsh stage and film actress.

Early life 
Eleanor Jane Daniels was born in Llanarthney and raised in Llanelli, the daughter David Daniels and Margaret Daniels. Her father was a hay merchant and publican. She had her first public success at age 13, when she won a prize at a local eisteddfod. She won three National Eisteddfod chairs by 1907, and studied acting with the Herbert Beerbohm Tree company.

Career 
Daniels taught school as a young woman, and acted in Welsh stage dramas in Great Britain. She toured the United States with the Welsh Players in 1914. She moved to the United States soon after, and appeared on stage and in silent films, with good reviews for her work, though Dorothy Parker commented that "Eleanor Daniels works enthusiastically at being funny."

Daniels' stage roles included parts in Change (London 1912, 1913, New York 1914), The Joneses (London 1913), Kitty MacKay (1914), Loyalty, Heart of the Heather, Zach, Kitty Darlin''' (1917), Lassies, La La Lucille (1919, 1920), Ashes (1924), The Beaten Track (1926), Juno and the Paycock (1926), and Rain. Her film appearances included a role in If Winter Comes'' (1923). She was a vocal coach in New York later in life, and had an office job with a diabetes charity.

Personal life 
Daniels died in 1994, aged 107 years, in Darien, Connecticut. A blue plaque honouring Daniels was unveiled in Llanelli in 2011.

References

External links 

 
 Video of the unveiling of the Eleanor Daniels blue plaque in Llanelli, 2011, on YouTube

1886 births
1994 deaths
People from Llanelli
Welsh actresses
Welsh centenarians
Women centenarians